The Ordnance Survey of Jerusalem of 1864–65 was the first scientific mapping of Jerusalem, and the first Ordnance Survey to take place outside the United Kingdom. It was undertaken by Charles William Wilson, a 28-year-old officer in the Royal Engineers corps of the British Army, under the authority of Sir Henry James, as Superintendent of the Ordnance Survey, and with the sanction of George Robinson, 1st Marquess of Ripon as Secretary of State for War. The team of six Royal Engineers began their work on 3 October 1864. The work was completed on 16 June 1865, and the report was published on 29 March 1866.

During the resulting search, he produced "the first perfectly accurate map [of Jerusalem], even in the eyes of modern cartography", and identified the eponymous Wilson's Arch. He was unable to find a new source of water.

Over a century after the survey, Dan Bahat described it as "a watershed in the exploration of Jerusalem and its past",. The Jerusalem Post said that Wilson's efforts "served as the basis for all future Jerusalem research".

The survey provided the foundation and impetus for the creation of the Palestine Exploration Fund. The first meeting of the Fund took place on 22 June 1865, less than a week after the completion of the Ordnance Survey, and Charles Wilson was appointed by the Fund as the Chief Director of their proposed exploration of the rest of Palestine. In July 1866 Dean Stanley described the Ordnance Survey as a "sort of pre-historic stage of our Palestine Exploration Fund".

It was the most influential and reliable map of Jerusalem until the British Mandate's Survey of Palestine, which published a 1:2,500 map of the Old City of Jerusalem in 1936.

History
The catalyst for the survey was an 1864 petition from Arthur Penrhyn Stanley (the Dean of Westminster), representing a committee which included the Bishop of London Archibald Campbell Tait, to George Robinson, 1st Marquess of Ripon (the Secretary of State for War). Dean Stanley had accompanied the Prince of Wales (later Edward VII) on his 1862 trip to Jerusalem; his request was for a survey to find new sources of water to improve the city's water supply. 

The cost of providing the Royal Engineers surveyors (Wilson and his team) was covered by the British Government's War Office. The introduction to the survey stated that the £500 cost of the survey was funded by the wealthy Angela Burdett-Coutts, 1st Baroness Burdett-Coutts, whose primary motivation was to find better drinking water for those living in the city. However, the issue of “water relief” to the city was subsequently sidelined; in the words of Moscrop “the issue just vanishes.” No improvements were made to the water supply until the end of the century.

As Austen Henry Layard made clear at the first public meeting of the PEF on 22 June 1865, the Ordnance Survey had been conducted “under the auspices of the War Department and with the sanction of the Government”

Legacy
One of the survey's most significant aspects was that it was the first work to investigate the underground features of the Temple Mount (referred to in the survey as the Haram As-Sharif), such as its cisterns, channels and aqueducts.

Archaeologist Shimon Gibson summed up the legacy of the Ordnance Survey of Jerusalem as follows (underline added): 

What is quite clear is that a major change in the character of the exploration of ancient Jerusalem occurred in the 19th century, with a fascination for the past of the city, fanciful or otherwise, being replaced by that of a scientific concern for the tangible antiquities of the city. The Ordnance Survey conducted by Wilson in 1864 and 1865 marks this turning point. The ancient past of Jerusalem was no longer a matter for armchair scholarly discourse, turning upon the credibility and background of a given scholar, but had now become a matter for clear-cut scientific rigor, which could only be based on facts obtained in empirical fashion, whether through the taking of exact measurements, photography, or excavations in the ground. 

The names of streets, buildings and points of interest were collected by Carl Sandreczki of the Church Mission Society and two assistants. Sandreczki's list, which included the names written in Arabic, is an invaluable resource as it contains many items that have otherwise been lost.

Bibliography

Primary sources

Secondary sources

 “Institutionalization.” Finding Jerusalem: Archaeology between Science and Ideology, by Katharina Galor, University of California Press, Oakland, California, 2017, pp. 28–42. JSTOR, www.jstor.org/stable/10.1525/j.ctt1pq349g.9.

References

Old maps of Jerusalem
Ordnance Survey
19th-century maps and globes
Palestine Exploration Fund